Geography of Macedonia may refer to:

 Geography of North Macedonia
 Geography of Greek region of Macedonia
 Geography of Pirin Macedonia